In probability theory and statistics, kurtosis (from , kyrtos or kurtos, meaning "curved, arching") is a measure of the "tailedness" of the probability distribution of a real-valued random variable. Like skewness, kurtosis describes a particular aspect of a probability distribution. There are different ways to quantify kurtosis for a theoretical distribution, and there are corresponding ways of estimating it using a sample from a population. Different measures of kurtosis may have different interpretations.

The standard measure of a distribution's kurtosis, originating with Karl Pearson, is a scaled version of the fourth moment of the distribution. This number is related to the tails of the distribution, not its peak; hence, the sometimes-seen characterization of kurtosis as "peakedness" is incorrect. For this measure, higher kurtosis corresponds to greater extremity of deviations (or outliers), and not the configuration of data near the mean.

It is common to compare the excess kurtosis (defined below) of a distribution to 0, which is the excess kurtosis of any univariate normal distribution. Distributions with negative excess kurtosis are said to be platykurtic, although this does not imply the distribution is "flat-topped" as is sometimes stated. Rather, it means the distribution produces fewer and/or less extreme outliers than the normal distribution. An example of a platykurtic distribution is the uniform distribution, which does not produce outliers.  Distributions with a positive excess kurtosis are said to be leptokurtic.  An example of a leptokurtic distribution is the Laplace distribution, which has tails that asymptotically approach zero more slowly than a Gaussian, and therefore produces more outliers than the normal distribution. It is common practice to use excess kurtosis, which is defined as Pearson's kurtosis minus 3, to provide a simple comparison to the normal distribution.  Some authors and software packages use "kurtosis" by itself to refer to the excess kurtosis. For clarity and generality, however, this article explicitly indicates where non-excess kurtosis is meant.

Alternative measures of kurtosis are: the L-kurtosis, which is a scaled version of the fourth L-moment; measures based on four population or sample quantiles. These are analogous to the alternative measures of skewness that are not based on ordinary moments.

Pearson moments 
The kurtosis is the fourth standardized moment, defined as

where μ4 is the fourth central moment and σ is the standard deviation. Several letters are used in the literature to denote the kurtosis.  A very common choice is κ, which is fine as long as it is clear that it does not refer to a cumulant.  Other choices include γ2, to be similar to the notation for skewness, although sometimes this is instead reserved for the excess kurtosis.

The kurtosis is bounded below by the squared skewness plus 1:

where μ3 is the third central moment. The lower bound is realized by the Bernoulli distribution. There is no upper limit to the kurtosis of a general probability distribution, and it may be infinite.

A reason why some authors favor the excess kurtosis is that cumulants are extensive.  Formulas related to the extensive property are more naturally expressed in terms of the excess kurtosis.  For example, let X1, ..., Xn be independent random variables for which the fourth moment exists, and let Y be the random variable defined by the sum of the Xi.  The excess kurtosis of Y is

In particular if all of the Xi have the same variance, then this simplifies to

The reason not to subtract 3 is that the bare fourth moment better generalizes to multivariate distributions, especially when independence is not assumed.  The cokurtosis between pairs of variables is an order four tensor.  For a bivariate normal distribution, the cokurtosis tensor has off-diagonal terms that are neither 0 nor 3 in general, so attempting to "correct" for an excess becomes confusing.  It is true, however, that the joint cumulants of degree greater than two for any multivariate normal distribution are zero.

For two random variables, X and Y, not necessarily independent, the kurtosis of the sum, X + Y, is
 
Note that the fourth-power binomial coefficients (1, 4, 6, 4, 1) appear in the above equation.

Interpretation 
The exact interpretation of the Pearson measure of kurtosis (or excess kurtosis) used to be disputed, but is now settled. As Westfall notes in 2014, "...its only unambiguous interpretation is in terms of tail extremity; i.e., either existing outliers (for the sample kurtosis) or propensity to produce outliers (for the kurtosis of a probability distribution)." The logic is simple: Kurtosis is the average (or expected value) of the standardized data raised to the fourth power.  Standardized values that are less than 1 (i.e., data within one standard deviation of the mean, where the "peak" would be) contribute virtually nothing to kurtosis, since raising a number that is less than 1 to the fourth power makes it closer to zero. The only data values (observed or observable) that contribute to kurtosis in any meaningful way are those outside the region of the peak; i.e., the outliers. Therefore, kurtosis measures outliers only; it measures nothing about the "peak".

Many incorrect interpretations of kurtosis that involve notions of peakedness have been given. One is that kurtosis measures both the "peakedness" of the distribution and the heaviness of its tail. Various other incorrect interpretations have been suggested, such as "lack of shoulders" (where the "shoulder" is defined vaguely as the area between the peak and the tail, or more specifically as the area about one standard deviation from the mean) or "bimodality". Balanda and MacGillivray assert that the standard definition of kurtosis "is a poor measure of the kurtosis, peakedness, or tail weight of a distribution" and instead propose to "define kurtosis vaguely as the location- and scale-free movement of probability mass from the shoulders of a distribution into its center and tails".

Moors' interpretation

In 1986 Moors gave an interpretation of kurtosis. Let
  
 
 
where X is a random variable, μ is the mean and σ is the standard deviation.

Now by definition of the kurtosis , and by the well-known identity 

.

The kurtosis can now be seen as a measure of the dispersion of Z2 around its expectation. Alternatively it can be seen to be a measure of the dispersion of Z around +1 and −1. κ attains its minimal value in a symmetric two-point distribution. In terms of the original variable X, the kurtosis is a measure of the dispersion of X around the two values μ ± σ.

High values of κ arise in two circumstances:
 
 where the probability mass is concentrated around the mean and the data-generating process produces occasional values far from the mean, 
 where the probability mass is concentrated in the tails of the distribution.

Excess kurtosis 
The excess kurtosis is defined as kurtosis minus 3. There are 3 distinct regimes as described below.

Mesokurtic 
Distributions with zero excess kurtosis are called mesokurtic, or mesokurtotic. The most prominent example of a mesokurtic distribution is the normal distribution family, regardless of the values of its parameters.

Leptokurtic 
A distribution with positive excess kurtosis is called leptokurtic, or leptokurtotic. "Lepto-" means "slender". In terms of shape, a leptokurtic distribution has fatter tails. Examples of leptokurtic distributions include the Student's t-distribution, Rayleigh distribution,  Laplace distribution, exponential distribution, Poisson distribution and the logistic distribution.  Such distributions are sometimes termed super-Gaussian.

Platykurtic 

A distribution with negative excess kurtosis is called platykurtic, or platykurtotic. "Platy-" means "broad". In terms of shape, a platykurtic distribution has thinner tails. Examples of platykurtic distributions include the continuous and discrete uniform distributions, and the raised cosine distribution. The most platykurtic distribution of all is the Bernoulli distribution with p = 1/2 (for example the number of times one obtains "heads" when flipping a coin once, a coin toss), for which the excess kurtosis is −2.

Graphical examples

The Pearson type VII family 

The effects of kurtosis are illustrated using a parametric family of distributions whose kurtosis can be adjusted while their lower-order moments and cumulants remain constant. Consider the Pearson type VII family, which is a special case of the Pearson type IV family restricted to symmetric densities. The probability density function is given by

where a is a scale parameter and m is a shape parameter.

All densities in this family are symmetric. The kth moment exists provided m > (k + 1)/2. For the kurtosis to exist, we require m > 5/2. Then the mean and skewness exist and are both identically zero. Setting a2 = 2m − 3 makes the variance equal to unity. Then the only free parameter is m, which controls the fourth moment (and cumulant) and hence the kurtosis. This yields a one-parameter leptokurtic family with zero mean, unit variance, zero skewness, and arbitrary non-negative excess kurtosis. The reparameterized density is

In the limit as  one obtains the density

which is shown as the red curve in the images on the right.

In the other direction as  one obtains the standard normal density as the limiting distribution, shown as the black curve.

In the images on the right, the blue curve represents the density  with excess kurtosis of 2. The top image shows that leptokurtic densities in this family have a higher peak than the mesokurtic normal density, although this conclusion is only valid for this select family of distributions. The comparatively fatter tails of the leptokurtic densities are illustrated in the second image, which plots the natural logarithm of the Pearson type VII densities: the black curve is the logarithm of the standard normal density, which is a parabola. One can see that the normal density allocates little probability mass to the regions far from the mean ("has thin tails"), compared with the blue curve of the leptokurtic Pearson type VII density with excess kurtosis of 2. Between the blue curve and the black are other Pearson type VII densities with γ2 = 1, 1/2, 1/4, 1/8, and 1/16. The red curve decreases the slowest as one moves outward from the origin ("has fat tails").

Other well-known distributions 

Several well-known, unimodal, and symmetric distributions from different parametric families are compared here.  Each has a mean and skewness of zero. The parameters have been chosen to result in a variance equal to 1 in each case. The images on the right show curves for the following seven densities, on a linear scale and logarithmic scale:

 D: Laplace distribution, also known as the double exponential distribution, red curve (two straight lines in the log-scale plot), excess kurtosis = 3
 S: hyperbolic secant distribution, orange curve, excess kurtosis = 2
 L: logistic distribution, green curve, excess kurtosis = 1.2
 N: normal distribution, black curve (inverted parabola in the log-scale plot), excess kurtosis = 0
 C: raised cosine distribution, cyan curve, excess kurtosis = −0.593762...
 W: Wigner semicircle distribution, blue curve, excess kurtosis = −1
 U: uniform distribution, magenta curve (shown for clarity as a rectangle in both images), excess kurtosis = −1.2.

Note that in these cases the platykurtic densities have bounded support, whereas the densities with positive or zero excess kurtosis are supported on the whole real line.

One cannot infer that high or low kurtosis distributions have the characteristics indicated by these examples. There exist platykurtic densities with infinite support,
e.g., exponential power distributions with sufficiently large shape parameter b

and there exist leptokurtic densities with finite support.
e.g., a distribution that is uniform between −3 and −0.3, between −0.3 and 0.3, and between 0.3 and 3, with the same density in the (−3, −0.3) and (0.3, 3) intervals, but with 20 times more density in the (−0.3, 0.3) interval

Also, there exist platykurtic densities with infinite peakedness,
e.g., an equal mixture of the beta distribution with parameters 0.5 and 1 with its reflection about 0.0 

and there exist leptokurtic densities that appear flat-topped,
e.g., a mixture of distribution that is uniform between -1 and 1 with a T(4.0000001) Student's t-distribution, with mixing probabilities 0.999 and 0.001.

Sample kurtosis

Definitions

A natural but biased estimator 

For a sample of n values, a method of moments estimator of the population excess kurtosis can be defined as

This formula has the simpler representation,

where the  values are the standardized data values using the standard deviation defined using n rather than n − 1 in the denominator.

For example, suppose the data values are 0, 3, 4, 1, 2, 3, 0, 2, 1, 3, 2, 0, 2, 2, 3, 2, 5, 2, 3, 999.

Then the   values are −0.239, −0.225, −0.221, −0.234, −0.230, −0.225, −0.239, −0.230, −0.234, −0.225, −0.230, −0.239, −0.230, −0.230, −0.225, −0.230, −0.216, −0.230, −0.225, 4.359

and the  values are  0.003, 0.003, 0.002, 0.003, 0.003, 0.003, 0.003, 0.003, 0.003, 0.003, 0.003, 0.003, 0.003, 0.003, 0.003, 0.003, 0.002, 0.003, 0.003, 360.976.

The average of these values is 18.05 and the excess kurtosis is thus 18.05 − 3 = 15.05.  This example makes it clear that data near the "middle" or "peak" of the distribution do not contribute to the kurtosis statistic, hence kurtosis does not measure "peakedness". It is simply a measure of the outlier, 999 in this example.

Standard unbiased estimator 
An alternative estimator of the population excess kurtosis, which is unbiased in random samples of a normal distribution, is defined as follows:

 

This adjusted Fisher–Pearson standardized moment coefficient  is the version found in Excel and several statistical packages including Minitab, SAS, and SPSS.

Unfortunately, in nonnormal samples  is itself generally biased.

Upper bound 
An upper bound for the sample kurtosis of n (n > 2) real numbers is

where  is the corresponding sample skewness.

Variance under normality 
The variance of the sample kurtosis of a sample of size n from the normal distribution is

Stated differently, under the assumption that the underlying random variable  is normally distributed, it can be shown that .

Applications 

The sample kurtosis is a useful measure of whether there is a problem with outliers in a data set. Larger kurtosis indicates a more serious outlier problem, and may lead the researcher to choose alternative statistical methods.

D'Agostino's K-squared test is a goodness-of-fit normality test based on a combination of the sample skewness and sample kurtosis, as is the Jarque–Bera test for normality.

For non-normal samples, the variance of the sample variance depends on the kurtosis; for details, please see variance.

Pearson's definition of kurtosis is used as an indicator of intermittency in turbulence. It is also used in magnetic resonance imaging to quantify non-Gaussian diffusion.

A concrete example is the following lemma by He, Zhang, and Zhang:
Assume a random variable  has expectation , variance  and kurtosis .
Assume we sample  many independent copies. Then
.

This shows that with  many samples, we will see one that is above the expectation with probability at least .
In other words: If the kurtosis is large, we might see a lot values either all below or above the mean.

Kurtosis convergence
Applying band-pass filters to digital images, kurtosis values tend to be uniform, independent of the range of the filter. This behavior, termed kurtosis convergence, can be used to detect image splicing in forensic analysis.

Other measures 
A different measure of "kurtosis" is provided by using L-moments instead of the ordinary moments.

See also 

 Kurtosis risk
 Maximum entropy probability distribution

References

Further reading 
 Alternative source (Comparison of kurtosis estimators)

External links 

 
 Kurtosis calculator
 Free Online Software (Calculator) computes various types of skewness and kurtosis statistics for any dataset (includes small and large sample tests)..
 Kurtosis on the Earliest known uses of some of the words of mathematics
 Celebrating 100 years of Kurtosis a history of the topic, with different measures of kurtosis.

Moment (mathematics)
Statistical deviation and dispersion